Chandawas is a village in Rewari mandal of the Rewari district, in the Indian state of Haryana. It is the first village when accessed through Rewari Kosli road. Mr. Sarjit Yadav is the Sarpanch of village.

Adjacent villages
 Kharagwas
 Budhpur
 Saharanwas

References

Villages in Rewari district